Pillitokome was a town of ancient Lycaonia, inhabited in Roman times. The name does not occur among ancient authors but is inferred from epigraphic and other evidence.

Its site is located 3 miles (5 km) west of Insuyu, Asiatic Turkey.

References

Populated places in ancient Lycaonia
Former populated places in Turkey
Roman towns and cities in Turkey
History of Konya Province